Wiri lava cave is Auckland's longest known lava cave at around 290 metres. It is part of Matukutūruru (Wiri Mountain) volcano, in the Auckland volcanic field. Because it features rare lava stalactites the cave has garnered international renown. The cave entrance is locked and entry is by permit only.

References

External links
 View of Wiri cave interior.
 2014 views

Caves of New Zealand
Auckland volcanic field
Lava caves
Lava tubes
Landforms of the Auckland Region